Xi Persei (ξ Persei, abbreviated Xi Per, ξ Per), known also as Menkib , is a star in the constellation of Perseus. Based upon parallax measurements taken during the Hipparcos mission, it is approximately 1,200 light-years from the Sun.

Nomenclature
ξ Persei (Latinised to Xi Persei) is the star's Bayer designation.

It bore the traditional name Menkib, Menchib, Menkhib or Al Mankib, from Mankib al Thurayya (Arabic for "shoulder" [of the Pleiades]). In 2016, the International Astronomical Union (IAU) organized a Working Group on Star Names (WGSN) to catalogue and standardize proper names for stars. The WGSN approved the name Menkib for this star on 12 September 2016 and it is now so included in the List of IAU-approved Star Names.

Properties
Xi Persei has an apparent magnitude of +4.06 and is classified as a blue giant (spectral class O7.5III). It is intrinsically 12,700 times brighter than the Sun with absolute magnitude −5.5 in the V band. If the ultraviolet light and light from other wavelengths that emanates from Menkib is included, its total bolometric luminosity is 263,000 times that of the Sun.

The star has a mass of some 30 solar masses and a surface temperature of 35,000 kelvins, making it one of the hottest stars that can be seen with the naked eye. The fluorescence of the California Nebula (NGC 1499) is due to this star's prodigious radiation. It is a member of the Perseus OB2 association of co-moving stars, but may be a runaway star since it is now separated by 200 pc from the association's center and has an unusually high radial velocity.

References

External links
 

O-type giants
Emission-line stars
Runaway stars
Perseus (constellation)
Persei, Xi
BD+35 0775
Persei, 46
024912
018614
1228
Menkib